Yau Tsim Mong District is one of 18 districts of Hong Kong, located on the western part of Kowloon Peninsula. It is the core urban area of Kowloon. The 2016 By-Census recorded the total population of Yau Tsim Mong District at 342,970.

Yau Tsim Mong District contains the urban areas of Yau Ma Tei, Tsim Sha Tsui, and Mong Kok, as well as Ferry Point, King's Park, Kwun Chung, Tai Kok Tsui, Tsim Sha Tsui East, the Union Square and Kowloon Point. Formerly two districts, the Yau Tsim District and Mong Kok District, it was combined in 1994. Its name is an acronym of the three aforementioned major areas.

History

The district was once called Yau Ma Tei District. It was renamed Yau Tsim District from 1 April 1988 to "remove any misconception that Tsim Sha Tsui was an administrative district separate from Yau Ma Tei".

Yau Tsim District and Mong Kok District were merged in 1994 to form the new Yau Tsim Mong District.

Areas within the district include

Transport

MTR
Six MTR lines serve this district: the Tsuen Wan line, Kwun Tong line, Tung Chung line, East Rail line, Tuen Ma line and the Airport Express.
 Tsuen Wan line and Kwun Tong line converge from the north at Prince Edward station, then Mong Kok and Yau Ma Tei the line's last station in the district and continue its journey to Whampoa. Tsuen Wan line continued to Jordan and Tsim Sha Tsui stations before crossing the harbour to Hong Kong Island.
 Tung Chung line has two stations along the west coast: Kowloon near Jordan and Olympic near Tai Kok Tsui. The former station is also served by the Airport Express.
 East Rail line has a station in Mong Kok East, while Hung Hom is on the boundary between Yau Tsim Mong and Kowloon City districts.
 Tuen Ma line and converge from the north at Austin station, then East Tsim Sha Tsui station and Hung Hom the line's last station in the district and continue its journey to Ma On Shan.

Major roads
Nathan Road
Shanghai Street
Austin Road
Canton Road
Cross-Harbour Tunnel
West Kowloon Highway
Western Harbour Crossing
Salisbury Road

Education 

Schools in Yau Tsim Mong District include:
 Sir Ellis Kadoorie Secondary School (West Kowloon)
 Diocesan Girls' School
 Mount Kelly Hong Kong

 Universities
Hong Kong Polytechnic University

See also
List of areas of Hong Kong
Kowloon peninsula

References

External links
Yau Tsim Mong District Council
List and map of electoral constituencies (large PDF file)